Alexandra Benediktsson (born 22 October 1994) is a Swedish footballer who plays for Piteå IF.

External links 
 

1994 births
Living people
Swedish women's footballers
IF Limhamn Bunkeflo players
Vittsjö GIK players
Damallsvenskan players
Women's association football defenders
Footballers from Malmö